Breaking out (Swedish title: Vägen ut) is a Swedish drama/comedy film from 1999, starring Björn Kjellman, Shanti Roney, Peter Haber, Viveka Seldahl and Michael Nyqvist.

Story

The film is about stage actor Reine who quits his job because he is tired of his boss messing people around. He takes a job at the Kumla Prison in hope that he can set up a play acted by the prisoners. The prisoners are not very interested until five of them realize that if they agree to do the play, they can escape while at a theatre. As the plot evolves, the actors are to various degrees forced to weigh this to their strengthening desire to do the play.

Actors

Björn Kjellman as Reine
Shanti Roney as Glenn
Peter Haber as Jakobsson
Viveka Seldahl as Hillevi
Michael Nyqvist as Diego
Thomas Hanzon as Ekman
Göran Ragnerstam as Heikki
Oliver Loftéen as Andrej
Lamine Dieng as Kostas

1999 films
1999 comedy-drama films
Swedish comedy-drama films
Films directed by Daniel Lind Lagerlöf
1990s Swedish-language films
1990s Swedish films